Muhja bint al-Tayyani (born in Córdoba, died in Córdoba 1097 CE) was an eleventh-century Andalusian poet.

Hardly any information is available about her life. She was the daughter of a merchant who was engaged in the sale of figs. She met Princess Wallada, who took her to her house and educated her. She became a poet, a profession that had a great recognition in Andalusian society.

Poems 

Muhja dedicated ferocious satires to her teacher:

This poem puns on Wallada's name, which literally means 'fecund'. It compares Wallada, ostensibly pregnant out of wedlock, to the Virgin Mary. The poem shifts from a literary register in the first half to a colloquial one in the second (characterised by the colloquial form hāḏī in place of classical hāḏihi). The second half alludes specifically to the Islamic account of the virgin birth, in which Mariam received a divine instruction to shake the trunk of a date palm while giving birth to Jesus, so that its fruits fall down to her. In Muhya's account, Wallada has grasped a penis to similar effect.

Another example is this verse:

Further reading

Sobh, Mahmud (2002), "Wallada bent al-Mustakfi. Muhya bent al-Tayyani", Historia de la literatura árabe clásica, Madrid: Cátedra, pp. 952–957.

References

Arabic-language women poets
Arabic-language poets
People from Córdoba, Spain
11th-century women writers
11th-century writers
Women poets from al-Andalus
1097 deaths